Barrett Benjamin Smith is a former American football wide receiver in the National Football League who played 42 games for the Green Bay Packers.  In 1973, the Green Bay Packers used the 21st pick in the 1st round of the 1973 NFL Draft to sign Smith out of the Florida State University.  Smith went on to play for three seasons with the Packers and one season with the Tampa Bay Buccaneers.  Smith retired from the NFL in 1976. On November 2, 2022, Barry was enshrined into the Florida Sports Hall Of Fame with fellow Seminole, and Buccaneer, Dexter Smith.

External links
NFL.com player page

1951 births
Living people
Sportspeople from West Palm Beach, Florida
Players of American football from Florida
American football wide receivers
Florida State Seminoles football players
Green Bay Packers players
Tampa Bay Buccaneers players